Micah Williams  (1782–1837) was a New Jersey folk art painter.

Biography
He was most likely born near Hempstead, New York or Essex County, New Jersey in 1782. From 1829 to 1833 he worked in New York City. He also worked as a portrait artist in and around New Brunswick and Monmouth County, New Jersey. The earliest work attributed to him is from around 1790. In 1806 he married in New Brunswick, New Jersey. The last work attributed to him was from 1833. He died in New Brunswick, New Jersey on November 21, 1837. He was initially buried in New Brunswick but was later reinterred in Van Liew Cemetery in North Brunswick, New Jersey.

References

1782 births
1837 deaths
19th-century American painters
19th-century American male artists
American male painters
People from Essex County, New Jersey
People from Monmouth County, New Jersey
Artists from New Brunswick, New Jersey